Zsolt Kiss (born 21 August 1986 in Győr) is a retired Hungarian footballer.

References

Player profile at HLSZ 

1986 births
Living people
Sportspeople from Győr
Hungarian footballers
Association football midfielders
Győri ETO FC players
Integrál-DAC footballers
Gyirmót FC Győr players
BFC Siófok players
Nemzeti Bajnokság I players